Kirk Hammerton is a village and civil parish in the Harrogate district of North Yorkshire, England. The village suffix refers to the Hamerton family who owned the land until the 16th century.

The village was historically part of the West Riding of Yorkshire until 1974.

History
(H)ambretone, a place-name reflected now in both Kirk Hammerton ("Hammerton with the church", from the Old Norse kirkja = "church") and Green Hammerton ("Hammerton with the green", from Middle English grene), is first attested in the Domesday Book of 1086. The name seems to derive from the Old English plant-name hamor (whose meaning is not certain but might include hammer-sedge or pellitory of the wall) + tūn 'settlement, farm, estate'. The course of Rudgate, a Roman road, passes the village.

The lands of the parish used to be held by the Hamerton family of Hellifield Peel Castle, part of their estate stretching from Slaidburn to York. Sir Stephen Hamerton was executed for treason at Tyburn in 1536 for participating in the Pilgrimage of Grace. Being of knightly rank, Sir Stephen was hanged and beheaded, but not drawn and quartered, and his lands seized by the crown. His son Henry died on 3 August 1537, and was buried in York Minster. Joan, the widow of Henry, died on 3 January 1538, leaving two infant children; Elizabeth, the widow of Sir Stephen, died on 3 May 1538, and was buried at Slaidburn. The Hellifield estates were held by the Crown until 1546, when they were granted out to George Brown, Esq., to be held by the King, in capita, for the sum of £292-9-2. In 1553 Sir Arthur Darcy, knight, bought the manor of Hellified and 12 messuages and a watermill, from George Brown and his wife. In 1556-7 the property passed into the hands of Anthony Watson and John Redman, both of whom were connected with the Hamertons by marriage. After much legal procedure, the Hellifield estates were alienated in 1561, and following a fine levied at Westminster, they were returned to the Hamertons in the person of John Hamerton, Esq., nephew of Sir Stephen. The village and nearby Green Hammerton still bear their name.

On 6 July 2014, Stage 2 of the 2014 Tour de France from York to Sheffield, passed through the village.

Geography
The 2001 Census recorded a parish population of 517 people in 195 households. The village is mostly south of the A59 York – Liverpool road between York and Knaresborough. The River Nidd meanders to the south and east of the village. The parish also includes the small hamlet of Wilstrop.

The parish is served by Hammerton railway station on the Harrogate Line which links York and Leeds. Cattal railway station is also within the parish boundary.

Governance
The parish is in the Selby and Ainsty parliamentary constituency. It is in the Ainsty ward of the North Yorkshire County Council and the Ribston Ward of Harrogate Borough Council.

The village Parish Council has six members.

Education
The village has one primary school, Kirk Hammerton Church of England Primary School. it also has a playgroup across the grounds of the school. Most pupils go on to get their secondary education at Boroughbridge High School.

Religion
The Church of England parish church of  St John the Baptist, was originally dedicated to Saint Quentin. The original Anglo-Saxon church is on the south side of the church and now forms the Lady Chapel following a major enlargement of the building in 1892. The interior of the church is richly decorated in a pre-Raphaelite style; the decorations were added at the time of the Victorian extension to the building.

There is also a Wesleyan chapel that was established in 1821, and moved to a larger building in 1899.

References

External links

Civil parishes in North Yorkshire
Villages in North Yorkshire